Dak is a village in Howmeh Rural District, in the Central District of Bam County, Kerman Province, Iran. At the  census, its population was 86, in 23 families.

References 

Populated places in Bam County